Syngrapha hochenwarthi is a moth of the family Noctuidae. It is found in the Alps (on height of 1700 to 2500 m), the mountainous areas of Northern Norway and Finland, the Ural mountains, the Balkan, the Caucasus and the Altai mountains.

The wingspan is 24–30 mm. The moth flies from June to September depending on the location.

The larvae feed on the leaves of several Plantago species.

Subspecies
The following subspecies are recognised:
Syngrapha hochenwarthi hochenwarthi (Alps)
Syngrapha hochenwarthi alaica
Syngrapha hochenwarthi cuprina
Syngrapha hochenwarthi lapponaris (Northern Scandinavia)

External links

Fauna Europaea
Syngrapha at Funet Taxonomy
www.lepiforum.de
www.noctuidae.de
www.schmetterlinge-deutschlands.de

Plusiinae
Moths of Europe
Moths of Asia
Moths described in 1785